The Office of the Inspector General (OTIG) serves to "provide impartial, objective and unbiased advice and oversight to the Army through relevant, timely and thorough inspection, assistance, investigations, and training." The position has existed since 1777, when Thomas Conway was appointed the first inspector. The department was reorganized many times, and almost abolished on several occasions. In its early days, the department was frequently merged with, or proposed to be part of the Adjutant General. It expanded greatly after the American Civil War, to the point that it had around 2,000 officers in 1993.  The current holder of the position is Donna W. Martin.

History 
The Office of the Inspector General of the United States Army dates back to the appointment of Augustin de la Balme (IG July 8, 1777October 11, 1777) as "inspector-general of the cavalry of the United States of America" and Philippe-Charles-Jean-Baptiste-Tronson Du Coudray (IG August 11, 1777September 15, 1777) as "Inspector General of Ordnance and Military Stores" during the American Revolutionary War. The first inspector general was Thomas Conway (IG December 13, 1777April 28, 1778). Next, Friedrich Wilhelm von Steuben (IG May 5, 1778April 15, 1784) was selected by Washington. The position continued, variously merged with, commanding or being commanded by the Adjutant General of the United States Army until after the American Civil War, when it was formally established as an office equivalent to other Army departments. Most people who ascend to this post receive the pay grade of O9.

After the war, the inspectorate continued to largely grow. It was criticized for performance during the Spanish–American War, but the role of the office soon increased significantly, to the point that anything affecting the army's efficiency was within its scope. Upon the outbreak of World War I, the department grew dramatically, shrinking during the Great Depression, and further growing throughout World War II and the Cold War.

Current role 
The Inspector General of the United States Army reports to the United States Secretary of the Army (SA) and the Chief of Staff of the United States Army (CSA). The IG investigates and reports on the "discipline, efficiency, economy, morale, training, and readiness" of the army, and acts as the "eyes, ears, voice, and conscience" of the SA and CSA. The inspectorate is authorized to undertake any investigations where they see necessary, and cooperates with the Office of the Inspector General, U.S. Department of Defense. The inspector is also responsible for inspecting various issues in the army including alleged problems within the army.

The OTIG is composed of officers, non-commissioned officers, and DA civilians. It has a field operating agency, the United States Army Inspector General Agency, which comprises operational and support divisions. Any inspector is required to take the Inspector General oath:

The Inspection Division has inspected or reviewed soldier readiness programs, risk management programs, anti-terrorism and force protection, extremist group activities, homosexual conduct policy implementation, and the No Gun Ri massacre during the Korean War.

References

Further reading

External links
 

United States Army
Federal government of the United States
Army Offfice of the Inspector Generanl